The Sligo Senior Football League is an annual Gaelic Athletic Association club league competition between the top Sligo clubs, operating in Division 1 of the league. The Senior League has been divided in two since 2004, with Division 1 comprising the leading eight sides, with the remainder in Division 1B, now known as Division 2.

Tourlestrane are the most successful club, having won on 16 occasions, the latest in 2021.

The trophy presented to the winners is the John White Cup.

Top winners (Division 1/Division 1A)

Roll of Honour (Division 1)
During 2010–2012 there were no league finals played. The team finishing top of the league table was deemed the winner.

Top winners (Division 1B)

Roll of Honour (Division 1B)

References

Sligo GAA 125 History (2010)

External links 

Sligo on Hoganstand
Sligo Club GAA

1